Robin Horton (1932 - 2019)  was an English social anthropologist and philosopher. Horton carried out specialised study in comparative religion since the 1950s where he challenged and expanded views in the study of the anthropology of religion.  He is notable for his comparison of traditional thought systems (including religion) to Western science. This formed the basis for his analysis of African thought that he published in two instalments in 1967. His work continues to be viewed as important in understanding traditional African religious approaches. For more than four decades Horton lived in Africa, where he conducted research on African indigenous religions, magic, mythology and rituals. During 40 years of residence in Africa, he worked as a researcher and a professor of philosophy and religion at several universities, including the University of Port Harcourt in Rivers State, Nigeria, and the University of Ife in Osun State, Nigeria.

Family life
Robin William Gray Horton and his sister were born to William Gray Horton and Gwen Horton.  His father was a Lieutenant Colonel of the Scots Guard who was also part of the British Bobsleigh at the 1924 Winter Olympics national team and his grandfather was the American impressionist painter William Samuel Horton.  His mother, Gwendolen Anna Le Bas Horton, was the elder daughter of an iron merchant from St. Brelade, Jersey, and sister to Molly Brocas Burrows, the sculptor, and the painter Edward Le Bas (1904–1966).. Horton's sister-in-law is renowned Nigerian sculptor Sokari Douglas Camp, about whose work he has written.

Theoretical contributions
Robin Horton viewed religion from an ethnoscience approach, where he linked religious understanding with scientific inquiry.  He viewed the two as having a similar approach of methodically unveiling the complex to achieve order and understanding from chaos.   Horton's analysis of African magic (paranormal) and mythology concludes that there is an overarching theory that lies behind the commonly accepted theory and that forms the basis of these beliefs. He sees mystical systems that drive "primitive" religions as theoretical structures that are dictated by concrete rules and are used to understand, in an interactive way, revealed anomalies, much like scientific endeavours theorise the physical world.  This literal approach is a reflection of striving to have a concrete and thus scientific method of studying and explaining the world they live in.

One of his classic works in the anthropology of religion and of other traditional knowledge systems is his 1968 essay in support of neo-Tylorians (followers of Edward Burnett Tylor), who took causal statements of someone in a pre-literate society at face value.  Horton notes that "the historian of ideas, operating on the premiss that 'things are what they seem', has been forging ahead most successfully with his interpretation of the European, thought-tradition; but the [orthodox] social anthropologist, operating on the premiss that 'things are not what they seem', has had little success in explaining why pre-literate peoples have the kind of ideas they do." He argued, for instance, that animism should be taken at face value without the rationalisation that it symbolically represents a social or political structure. Horton maintained that a more useful approach would be to compare traditional thought to modern science. The fact that a traditional explanation may be shown to be mistaken in terms of modern science, by no means indicates that the explanation is held by a less intelligent group of people.  Horton was not willing to follow Tylor's view that holding theories that were mistaken is evidence of the childishness of traditional thought, pointing out that historians of science have shown that many rationally demonstrated scientific views were subsequently shown to be mistaken and were replaced.

He attributes an intellectualist view to religion and rejects the symbolic, Durkheimian, understanding of religion, as patronising to the so-called "primitives" who have a literal approach to their beliefs.  However, one of his critics who held to the symbolistic approach, anthropologist John H. Beattie, argued that traditional/primitive religions were symbolic because the cultures that held to these beliefs did so in cases where there was no empirical explanation to a phenomenon; thus it was attributed to the supernatural, such as spirits and any physical representations of such, were merely symbolic.

When he lived in New Calabar among the Kalabari people, Horton studied the processes that lead to social change.

Professional career
Beginning in 1960s, Horton published his theories of religion in several journal articles and books. His scientific approach to the understanding of "primitive" religion was groundbreaking in an era during which the prevailing view was a Western elitist conceptualisation of "primitive" religion as a construct of less intelligent "savages" and "barbarians" (terms now considered to be anachronistic and pejorative). Horton conducted his fieldwork in Nike in northern Igboland, Nigeria and among the Kalabari people of the eastern Niger Delta.

In 1965, under the commission of the Federal Republic of Nigeria's Department of Antiquities, Horton produced a compilation of 72 Kalabari Ijo Art photographs accompanied by a booklet explaining the meaning and utility of these artistic objects within the Kalabari culture. The photographs provide a visual record of native art of the Kalabari people, serves as a reference for tradition practices that are continually subject to mutating influences through acculturation such as has happened in the region during the years that followed colonisation.  Some of his photographs are archived at the Royal Anthropological Institute of Great Britain and Ireland (RAI), labelled as MS 345, MS 349. 

Horton worked as a senior research fellow and a lecturer in social anthropology at the Institute of African Studies for the University of Ibadan before moving to the University of Port Harcourt as a professor of philosophy and comparative religion.  At the University of Ibadan he collaborated with Ruth Finnegan who, at that time (1965–69) was also lecturing at the university in socio-anthropology. This collaboration led to the co-edited volume Modes of Thought, which addressed the question of whether there were fundamental differences, either in content, logic, or formulation, between modern or Western thought on the one hand, and traditional or non-Western thought on the other.  In the mid-1970s, Professor Horton served as faculty on the Department of Sociology at the University of Ife now known as Obafemi Awolowo University in Nigeria.

Published in 1997, his Patterns of Thought in Africa and the West: Magic, Religion and Science is a compilation of some of his classic essays published between 1960 and 1990. His work continues to influence new scholars in the field of anthropology of religion.
As of 1 October 2012, Professor Robin Horton's appointment as an Honorary Research Associate in the Department of Religious and Cultural Studies at the University of Port Harcourt was renewed for another five years.

Honours
Named as a notable Nigerian historian in the City of Port Harcourt's 2012 bid for World Book Capital in 2014. 
Part of the editorial board of Kiabara Journal of Humanities, 1981.
1951 Recipient of Scholarship Award in Natural Sciences; New College, Oxford University
 2nd Lt. for the Scots Guards.

Selected works
Patterns of Thought in Africa and the West: Essays on Magic, Religion and Science (1997), 
Kalabari Sculpture. Dept. of Antiquities, Federal Republic of Nigeria, 1965
"Destiny and the Unconscious in West Africa". Africa: Journal of the International African Institute, Vol. 31, No. 2 (April 1961), pp. 110–116
"African Traditional Thought and Western Science". Africa: Journal of the International African Institute, Vol. 37, No. 1 (January 1967), pp. 50–71; Vol. 37, No. 2 (April 1967), pp. 155–187
"The Kalabari 'Ekine' Society: A Borderland of Religion and Art". Africa: Journal of the International African Institute, Vol. 33, No. 2 (April 1963), pp. 94–114
Ritual man in Africa. Africa: Journal of the International African Institute, Vol. 34, No. 2 (April 1964), pp. 85–104
"The Kalabari World-View: An Outline and Interpretation", Africa: Journal of the International African Institute, Vol. 32, No. 3 (July 1962), pp. 197–220
"African Conversion", Africa: Journal of the International African Institute, Vol. 41, No. 2 (April 1971), pp. 85–108
"On the Rationality of Conversion. Part I", Africa: Journal of the International African Institute, Vol. 45, No. 3 (1975), pp. 219–235
"On the Rationality of Conversion. Part II", Africa: Journal of the International African Institute, Vol. 45, No. 4 (1975), pp. 373–399
"The High God: A Comment on Father O'Connell's Paper", Man, Vol. 62, (September 1962), pp. 137–140
"Judaeo-Christian Spectacles: Boon or Bane to the Study of African Religions?" (Les lunettes juderbéo-chrétiennes: aubaine ou fléau pour l'étude des religions africaines?) Cahiers d'Études africaines, Vol. 24, Cahier 96 (1984), pp. 391–436

Co-author
Robin Horton, J. D. Y. Peel.  Conversion and Confusion: A Rejoinder on Christianity in Eastern Nigeria. Canadian Journal of African Studies / Revue Canadienne des Études Africaines, Vol. 10, No. 3 (1976), pp. 481–498
Max Gluckman, G. Dieterlen and Robin Horton.  "Daryll Forde: Further Tributes".  Africa: Journal of the International African Institute, Vol. 44, No. 1 (January 1974), pp. 1–10.
J. F. Ade Ajayi and Robin Horton. "Michael Crowder, 1934–88". Africa: Journal of the International African Institute, Vol. 59, No. 1, 1989, pp. 110–118

See also
Ethnoscience
List of anthropologists
Magic (paranormal)
Theories of religion
Magical Thinking

References

Bibliography
 Wiredu, Kwasi (1996), "Cultural Universals and Particulars : An African Perspective". In African systems of thought. Indiana University Press. .
Carmody, Brendan Patrick.  "Conversion and Jesuit Schooling in Zambia". Studies in Christian Missions. .
 R. W Hefner, ed. "Conversion to Christianity: Historical and Anthropological Perspectives on a Great Transformation" (Berkeley, 1993).
Humphrey J. Fisher (1985), "The Juggernaut's Apologia: Conversion to Islam in Black Africa". Africa: Journal of the International Institute, Vol. 55, No. 2, pp. 153–173.
Cox, James L. (2001), "Missionaries, the Phenomenology of Religion and 'Re-Presenting' Nineteenth-Century African Religion: a Case Study of Peter McKenzie's Hail Orisha!" Journal of Religion in Africa, Vol. 31, No. 3, pp. 336–353.
Meyer, Birgit (2002), "Christianity and the Ewe Nation: German Pietist missionaries, Ewe converts and the politics of culture". Journal of religion in Africa, Vol. 33, No. 2, pp. 167–199.
 Klein, Martin A. (2001), "The slave trade and decentrialized societies".  The Journal of African History Vol.42, No. 1, pp. 49–65
 Hubbell, Andrew (2001), "A view of the slave trade from the margin: Souroudougou in the late nineteenth-century slave trade of  the Niger Bend". Journal of African History, Vol. 42, No. 1,  pp. 25 – 47.
 Kaplan, Steven (1992), "Indigenous Categories and the Study of World Religions in Ethiopia: the Case of the Beta Israel (Falasha)". Journal of religion in Africa, Vol. 22, No. 3, pp. 208–221.
Ellis, Stephen; Gerrie Ter Haar (1998), "Religion and politics in Sub-Saharan Africa". The Journal of Modern African Studies, Vol. 36, No. 2, pp. 175–201.
Isichei, Elizabeth (1988), "On Masks and Audible Ghosts: Some Secret Male Cults in Central Nigeria1". Journal of Religion in Africa, Vol. 18, No. 1, pp. 42–70.
Wilcox, Rosalinde G. (2002), "Commercial transactions and cultural interactions from the Delta to Douala and beyond". African Arts, Vol. 35, No. 1, pp 42–55, and 93–95.
Allsworth-Jones, P. (1996), "Continuity and Change in Yoruba Pottery". Bulletin of the School of Oriental and African Studies, Vol. 59, No. 2, pp. 312–322.
 Searing, James F. (2003), "Conversion to Islam: Military recruitment and general conflict in a Sereer-Safèn Village (Bandia), 1920–38". The Journal of African History, Vol. 44, No. 1, pp. 73–94.
 Alagoa, E. J. (1971), "The Development of Institutions in the States of the Eastern Niger Delta". The Journal of African History, Vol. 12, No. 2, pp. 269–278.
Ellis, Stephen (2008), "The Okije Shrine: Death and Life in Nigerian Politics". The Journal of African History, Vol. 49, No. 3, pp 445–466.
Sieber, Roy; Barry Hecht (2002), "Eastern Nigerian art from the Toby and Barry Hecht collection".  African Arts,  Vol.35, No. 1, p. 56.

External links 

 

Social anthropologists
2019 deaths
Academic staff of the University of Port Harcourt
Academic staff of the University of Ibadan
Academic staff of Obafemi Awolowo University
British emigrants to Nigeria
British expatriate academics
1932 births
Historians of Nigeria
British Africanists
British anthropologists